Ji'an County is a county of west-central Jiangxi province, China. It is under the jurisdiction of the prefecture-level city of Ji'an.

Administrative divisions
In the present, Ji'an County has 1 subdistrict ,12 towns and 7 townships.
1 subdistrict
 Gaoxin

12 towns

7 townships

Demographics 

References

External links

  Government site - 

County-level divisions of Jiangxi